Larissa Kosorukova-Pesyakhovich (born May 30, 1973) is a Russian-born Israeli sprint canoer who competed from the mid-1990s to the mid-2000s (decade). She won three bronze medals at the ICF Canoe Sprint World Championships, earning them in 1995 (K-2 200 m for Russia under her maiden name of Kosorukova), 1998 (K-4 200 m for Russia under her married name of Pesyakhovich), and 2002 (K-2 1000 m for Israel under her married name).

Kosorukova-Pesyakhovich also competed in three Summer Olympics. Competing for Russia at the 1996 Games in Atlanta, she finished seventh in the K-4 500 m and eighth in the K-2 500 m. Four years later in Sydney, Kosorukova-Pesyakhovich competed for Israel in the K-2 500 m event, but was eliminated in the semifinals. She closed out her Olympic career at the 2004 Games in Athens with her best overall finish of sixth in the K-1 500 m event.

Kosorukova-Pesyakhovich moved to Israel following the 1998 ICF Canoe Sprint World Championships in Szeged.

References

External links
 

1973 births
Russian emigrants to Israel
Canoeists at the 1996 Summer Olympics
Canoeists at the 2000 Summer Olympics
Canoeists at the 2004 Summer Olympics
Israeli female canoeists
Living people
Olympic canoeists of Israel
Olympic canoeists of Russia
Russian female canoeists
ICF Canoe Sprint World Championships medalists in kayak